Storm Sanders and Luisa Stefani defeated Anna Danilina and Beatriz Haddad Maia in the final, 7–6(7–4), 6–7(2–7), [10–8] to win the doubles tennis title at the 2022 Guadalajara Open.

This was the first time that Guadalajara hosted a WTA 1000-level event, having hosted the previous year's WTA Finals.

Seeds
The top four seeds received a bye into the second round.

Draw

Finals

Top half

Bottom half

References

External links 
Main draw

Guadalajara Open Akron